The 2022 European Cricket League is a T10 cricket competition. It will be the second edition of the European Cricket League and held at the Cartama Oval in Málaga, Spain. It was postponed from 2021 due to the COVID-19 pandemic in Spain.

Background 
The European Cricket League was founded in 2019 by German cricketer Daniel Weston intended as a way to develop cricket in emerging nations in Europe as a cricket equivalent to football's UEFA Champions League. In 2020, it was announced the European Cricket League expanded from 8 teams to include the national club champions of 30 European countries. This came after Weston signed agreements with several European cricket boards to ensure their domestic champions would be invited.

The host for the 2021 and 2022 editions was announced as Spain. The Cartama Oval in Málaga was chosen as the host city ahead of La Manga, Murcia, who were due to host in 2021. It was announced the 2022 edition would run from 7 February 2022 to 25 March.

Participants 
The following teams were invited to take part as champions of their domestic leagues. The draw was made according to International Cricket Council seedings with England's ECB National Club Twenty20 champions Tunbridge Wells entering as top seeds. Jersey's Farmers expressed concern about the scheduling of the tournament due to the Jersey national cricket team's participation in the 2019–2022 ICC Cricket World Cup Challenge League and qualifiers for the 2022 ICC Men's T20 World Cup, as well as their players needing to use leave from their jobs to play. The reigning European Cricket League champions VOC Rotterdam were also invited back to participate.

It was announced that, due to issues with getting visas, that Petersburg Sporting would not be taking part in their group. They would be replaced by the Calpe Giants of Gibraltar.

Group stage 
The Group Stage is to be played across the first 5 weeks of the tournament, with each Group lasting a week. Each week starts with a 3-day round-robin tournament, from which the top 3 progress to a Super 3 playoff. The bottom two teams face off in an eliminator, with the winner going on to play the team who finished 4th. The winner of that game then plays the 3rd place team from the Super 3 playoff, while the Top 2 from that playoff play each other in the first Qualifier. The loser of that game and the winner of the third eliminator then play in the second qualifier. The winners of the Qualifiers then play in the group final to decide the overall Group Winner.

Group A

Round robin

Super Three

Eliminators

Qualifiers and Final

Group B

Round robin

Super Three

Eliminators

Qualifiers and Final

Group C

Round robin

Super Three

Eliminators

Qualifiers and Final

Group D

Round robin

Super Three

Eliminators

Qualifiers and Final

Group E

Round robin

Super Three

Eliminators

Qualifiers and Final

Championship Week 
The Champions Week features a slightly modified version of the Group Stage model. The 5 group winners play in a double round-robin format from the Monday to Thursday. The top 2 teams after this progress to the 1st Qualifier, while 3rd and 4th go to the Eliminator. The loser of the Qualifier and the Winner of the Eliminator then face off for the right to play the Qualifier winner in the Championship Final. The teams moving on to the Finals week are:

Due to adverse weather conditions in Malaga, the first 3 days of competition were suspended. The games were shortened to 5 overs a side, with 10 games on Day 1 (Thursday), and 10 games on Day 2 (Friday), with the Saturday now acting as the Final Day of the tournament

Round robin

Eliminator, Qualifiers and Final

Statistics

Most Runs

Most Wickets

References 

European Cricket League
European Cricket League
European Cricket League
European Cricket League, 2022
European Cricket League
European Cricket League
2020s in Andalusia